The former United States Post Office is a historic building located in Creston, Iowa, United States.  Built in 1901, the building housed the post office on the main floor and a federal courtroom on the second floor.  The combination Beaux-Arts and Georgian Revival structure was designed by James Knox Taylor who was the Supervising Architect of the United States Department of the Treasury.  The Beaux-Arts style is found in the cornice, lucarnes, portico, and the
door and window enframements.  The Georgian Revival is found in the general mass and elevation of the building, window detail, use of brick, the hipped roof, and the division of the main facade into a projecting central pavilion and single-bay wings.  The building was listed on the National Register of Historic Places in 1978.  The post office has subsequently been relocated to a more modern building, and this building has been converted into commercial space.

See also 
List of United States post offices

References 

Government buildings completed in 1901
Creston, Iowa
Beaux-Arts architecture in Iowa
Georgian Revival architecture in Iowa
Buildings and structures in Union County, Iowa
Post office buildings on the National Register of Historic Places in Iowa
National Register of Historic Places in Union County, Iowa
1901 establishments in Iowa